Oliver Frank Fletcher (March 6, 1891 – October 7, 1974) was an American baseball player.  Born in Hildreth, Illinois, he played shortstop and third base and batted and threw right-handed. He sometimes played under the name Fletcher Franks.

Fletcher played minor league baseball with the Harrisburg Coal Miners of the Kentucky–Illinois–Tennessee League and the Syracuse Stars of the New York State League. He originally played as a third baseman, but switched to shortstop upon joining the Stars in 1914. The Syracuse Herald called him "one of the snappiest young players" in his league.

He struck out in his only at-bat. Phillies manager Pat Moran gave him a trial during the next season, but he did not appear in any major league games that year.

Fletcher later served as a coach for Clearwater High School's baseball team. He died in St. Petersburg, Florida in 1974.

References

External links

1891 births
1974 deaths
Baseball players from Illinois
Philadelphia Phillies players
Muscatine Wallopers players
Alton Blues players
Bloomington Bloomers players
Saginaw Aces players
Kitchener Beavers players
St. Petersburg Saints players